19763 Klimesh, provisional designation , is a stony Phocaea asteroid and slow rotator from the inner regions of the asteroid belt, approximately 7 kilometers in diameter. Discovered by NEAT at Haleakala Observatory in 2000, the asteroid was named for NEAT's software specialist Matthew Klimesh.

Discovery 

Klimesh was discovered on 18 June 2000, by NASA's and JPL's Near-Earth Asteroid Tracking program (NEAT) with the Maui Space Surveillance System (MSSS) at the Haleakala Observatory site on the island of Maui, Hawaii, in the United States. The body's observation arc begins 15 years prior to its official discovery observation, with a precovery from the Digitized Sky Survey taken at the Australian Siding Spring Observatory in September 1985.

Orbit and classification 

This asteroid is a member of the Phocaea family, a group of asteroids with similar orbital characteristics. It orbits the Sun in the inner main-belt at a distance of 1.9–2.9 AU once every 3 years and 8 months (1,350 days). Its orbit has an eccentricity of 0.20 and an inclination of 23° with respect to the ecliptic.

Physical characteristics 

Klimesh has been characterized as a stony S-type asteroid. It is possibly a "tumbler", that is, it might undergo a non-principal axis rotation.

Slow rotator 

Klimesh is a slow rotator, as it has a rotation period of 101 hours with a brightness variation of  magnitude. The photometric observations were made by Czech astronomer Petr Pravec at the Ondřejov Observatory during the asteroid's 2011-opposition.

The result supersedes a period of 4.4 hours with an amplitude of 0.12, obtained from a fragmentary lightcurve by Italian astronomer Silvano Casulli.

Diameter and albedo 

According to the survey carried out by the NEOWISE mission of NASA's Wide-field Infrared Survey Explorer, Klimesh has a diameter of 5.65 and 7.27 kilometers with an albedo of 0.24 and 0.175, respectively. The Collaborative Asteroid Lightcurve Link adopts Petr Pravec's revised WISE-data, that is, an albedo of 0.1635 and a diameter of 7.29 kilometers with an absolute magnitude of 13.27.

Naming 

This minor planet was named after JPL researcher Matthew Klimesh (born 1968), developer of the compression algorithm used for handling the vast amount of data obtained by the discovering NEAT program. Since 1996 at JPL's Communications Systems and Research Section, his work includes data compression, rate–distortion theory and channel coding. The official naming citation was published by the Minor Planet Center on 9 May 2001.

References

References

External links 
 Ondrejov Asteroid Photometry Project, Pravec, P.; Wolf, M.; Sarounova, L. (2011)
 Asteroid Lightcurve Database (LCDB), query form (info )
 Dictionary of Minor Planet Names, Google books
 Asteroids and comets rotation curves, CdR – Observatoire de Genève, Raoul Behrend
 Discovery Circumstances: Numbered Minor Planets (15001)-(20000) – Minor Planet Center
 
 

019763
019763
Named minor planets
019763
20000618